Snapfinger may refer to:
Snapfinger, Georgia, an unincorporated community in DeKalb County, Georgia, United States
Snapfinger, Mississippi, the fictional location of Deborah Wiles' novel Each Little Bird That Sings